Wetzel County is a county in the U.S. state of West Virginia. As of the 2020 census, the population was 14,442. Its county seat is New Martinsville. The county, founded in 1846, is named for Lewis Wetzel, a famous frontiersman and Indian fighter. Its northern border aligns with the Mason-Dixon line, but is to the west of the line's western terminus.

History
Wetzel County was formed in 1846 from part of Tyler County, Virginia.  On June 20, 1863, at the height of the Civil War, Wetzel was one of fifty Virginia counties admitted to the Union as the state of West Virginia.

Later that year, West Virginia's counties were divided into civil townships, with the intention of encouraging local government.  This proved impractical in the heavily rural state, and in 1872 the townships were converted into magisterial districts.  Wetzel County was divided into six districts: Center, Church, Grant, Green, Magnolia, and Proctor.  A seventh district, Clay, was formed in the 1880s.  New Martinsville, the county seat, was in Magnolia District.  Except for minor adjustments, the seven historic magisterial districts remained largely unchanged for a century, until the 1980s, when they were consolidated into three new districts: District 1, District 2, and District 3.

Geography

Major highways

Adjacent counties
 Marshall County (north)
 Greene County, Pennsylvania (northeast)
 Monongalia County (east)
 Marion County (east)
 Harrison County (southeast)
 Doddridge County (south)
 Tyler County (southwest)
 Monroe County, Ohio (west)

National protected area
 Ohio River Islands National Wildlife Refuge (part)

Demographics

2000 census
As of the census of 2000, there were 17,693 people, 7,164 households, and 5,079 families living in the county.  The population density was 49 people per square mile (19/km2).  There were 8,313 housing units at an average density of 23 per square mile (9/km2).  The racial makeup of the county was 98.92% White, 0.08% Black or African American, 0.10% Native American, 0.32% Asian, 0.02% Pacific Islander, 0.03% from other races, and 0.53% from two or more races.  0.42% of the population were Hispanic or Latino of any race.

There were 7,164 households, out of which 30.20% had children under the age of 18 living with them, 57.70% were married couples living together, 9.30% had a female householder with no husband present, and 29.10% were non-families. 25.70% of all households were made up of individuals, and 12.80% had someone living alone who was 65 years of age or older.  The average household size was 2.45 and the average family size was 2.92.

In the county, the population was spread out, with 23.80% under the age of 18, 6.80% from 18 to 24, 26.50% from 25 to 44, 26.80% from 45 to 64, and 16.20% who were 65 years of age or older.  The median age was 40 years. For every 100 females there were 94.30 males.  For every 100 females age 18 and over, there were 91.20 males.

The median income for a household in the county was $30,935, and the median income for a family was $36,793. Males had a median income of $37,296 versus $19,339 for females. The per capita income for the county was $16,818.  About 15.30% of families and 19.80% of the population were below the poverty line, including 26.60% of those under age 18 and 15.20% of those age 65 or over.

2010 census
As of the 2010 United States census, there were 16,583 people, 6,968 households, and 4,768 families living in the county. The racial makeup of the county was 98.7% white, 0.2% Asian, 0.1% American Indian, 0.1% black or African American, 0.2% from other races, and 0.6% from two or more races. Those of Hispanic or Latino origin made up 0.5% of the population. In terms of ancestry, 27.5% were German, 16.0% were Irish, 12.8% were American, and 12.4% were English.

Of the 6,968 households, 28.1% had children under the age of 18 living with them, 53.4% were married couples living together, 10.4% had a female householder with no husband present, 31.6% were non-families, and 27.4% of all households were made up of individuals. The average household size was 2.36 and the average family size was 2.83. The median age was 44.8 years.

The median income for a household in the county was $36,636 and the median income for a family was $48,523. Males had a median income of $45,833 versus $25,033 for females. The per capita income for the county was $19,899. About 13.1% of families and 17.5% of the population were below the poverty line, including 26.5% of those under age 18 and 13.7% of those age 65 or over.

Politics
Wetzel County was a rarity among northern West Virginia counties in supporting secession at the Virginia Secession Convention, and it reliably supported Democratic presidential candidates for the next ninety years. The first Republican to carry Wetzel County was Herbert Hoover in 1928 due to anti-Catholicism, but the county afterwards stayed Democratic until 1952. Since that time Wetzel County has followed the politics of West Virginia: a Democratic-leaning state up to the Clinton Era, after which the Democratic Party's consistent shift to social-liberal positions and support of green policies – an antithesis to the region's traditional economy – have caused Wetzel County to trend rapidly toward the Republican Party.

Local lore
In the mid-to-late 19th century a band similar to the James Gang of legend existed that was known as the Jennings Gang. A number of robberies and murders were accounted to this gang. They were known to be located near the head of Doolin Run near Tarpan Ridge. The home they occupied was found to have an escape tunnel that had been used to escape capture on several occasions. A local group of citizens known as the "Redmen" ultimately cornered the gang at this home and a number of the members were killed. A detailed description exists in the Wetzel County History written approximately in 1900.

The oldest oil well location known is of one drilled on Long Run near Doolin Run which reached oil at a depth about 360 ft.

Wetzel County has a long history in the Oil and Gas producing industry. During the Oil boom of the 19th century it is reported that the Proctor Creek watershed had 12 saloons and numerous livery/hotels to accommodate the hundreds of logging and oil field workers.

Communities

Cities
 New Martinsville (county seat)
 Paden City (part)

Towns
 Hundred
 Pine Grove
 Smithfield

Magisterial districts

Current
 District 1
 District 2
 District 3

Historic
 Center
 Church
 Clay
 Grant
 Green
 Magnolia
 Proctor

Census-designated places
 Jacksonburg
 Littleton
 Reader

Unincorporated communities

 Bebee
 Big Run
 Burton
 Coburn
 Earnshaw
 Folsom
 Hastings
 Knob Fork
 Maud
 Porters Falls
 Proctor
 Rockport
 Silver Hill
 Wheat
 Wileyville

See also
 Cecil H. Underwood Wildlife Management Area
 Harker Run
 Lewis Wetzel Wildlife Management Area
 National Register of Historic Places listings in Wetzel County, West Virginia

Footnotes

References

 
West Virginia counties on the Ohio River
Counties of Appalachia
1846 establishments in Virginia
Populated places established in 1846